The Partnership for Global Infrastructure and Investment (PGII) is a collaborative effort by Group of Seven to fund infrastructure projects in developing nations based on the trust principles of the Blue Dot Network. It is considered to be the bloc's counter to China's Belt and Road Initiative and a key component of the “Biden Doctrine”.

History 

The partnership plan was announced for the first time in June 2022 during the 48th G7 summit in Germany. According to an article by Center for Strategic and International Studies, PGII is the repackaged version of the Build Back Better World (B3W) initiative which President Biden announced at the 47th G7 summit in the United Kingdom.

Blue Dot Network 

The Blue Dot Network (BDN) is a multi-stakeholder initiative formed by the United States, Japan, and Australia to provide assessment and certification of infrastructure development projects worldwide on measures of financial transparency, environmental sustainability, and impact on economic development, with the goal of mobilizing private capital to invest abroad. It was initially led by the U.S. International Development Finance Corporation (DFC), Japan Bank for International Cooperation, and Department of Foreign Affairs and Trade of Australia.

On 4 November 2019, U.S Under Secretary of State Keith Krach formally launched the Blue Dot Network with his Australia and Japan counterparts with access to $60 billion of capital from the DFC at the Indo-Pacific Business Forum. Krach made three major related announcements in energy, infrastructure and digital initiatives which consisted of a new multilateral infrastructure initiative unveiled by the U.S., the signing of a $10 billion agreement strengthening the Japan-U.S. Strategic Energy Partnership; and the plan to spur digitally driven economic growth economic in the Indo-Pacific. In all three economic pillars, Under Secretary Krach engaged in US-ASEAN Business Council and U.S. Chamber of Commerce by implementing advanced U.S. efforts in establishing a set of global trust standards.

On 29 January 2020, Blue Dot Network's steering committee holds its first meeting in Washington with US, Australia and Japan. Under Secretary Krach commits $2 million of U.S State Department seed money for the steering committee and issues a public invitation to all other G-7 members to come on board.

On 25 February 2020, the Blue Dot Network is incorporated in the India-U.S. Comprehensive Global Strategic Partnership Joint Statement.

On 20 November 2020, Taiwan joins the Blue Dot Network with the signing of the U.S.-Taiwan Economic Prosperity Partnership (EPP) between Taiwan Minister John Deng and Under Secretary of State Keith Krach at the EPP Dialogue's inaugural meeting in Washington.

On 19 October 2020, on behalf of the Twelve Three Seas nations, President Kersti Kaljulaid endorses the Blue Dot Network and the Clean Network at the Three Seas Summit in Tallinn, Estonia. U.S. Under Secretary of State Krach commits a $1 billion investment with the initial investment of $300 million in trusted clean infrastructure, as described in the Blue Dot standards for roads, bridges, railways, 5G, ports, and energy projects in the Three Seas region between the Baltic, Adriatic, and Black seas. The goal is to stimulate investments by each member country.

On 14 January 2021, Georgia adopts the Blue Dot Network as part of joining the Clean Network Alliance of Democracies at the signing ceremony between Georgian Minister of Economy and Sustainable Development Natia Turnava and US Under Secretary of State Keith Krach.

On 7 June 2021, the OECD commits to supporting the Blue Dot Network at meeting of the Executive Consultation Group in Paris, France.

Build Back Better World 

On 12 June 2021, the Group of Seven (G7) announced the adoption of the Build Back Better World (B3W) initiative built off the progress and principles of the Blue Dot Network to counter China's BRI to address the $40 trillion worth of infrastructure needed by developing countries by 2035. The initiative aims to catalyze funding for quality infrastructure for of low- and middle-income countries[1]  from the private sector and will encourage private-sector investments that support "climate, health and health security, digital technology, and gender equity and equality."  On June 26, 2022, the initiative was relaunched and renamed as the Partnership for Global Infrastructure and Investment (PGII) at the 47th G7 summit in the United Kingdom.

Standards and principles 

The PGII efforts are in line with the standards and trust principles of the Blue Dot Network (BDN), which Under Secretary of State Keith Krach formally launched in 2019 at the Indo-Pacific Business Forum in Bangkok. These global trust standards, which are based on "respect for transparency and accountability, sovereignty of property and resources, local labor and human rights, rule of law, the environment, and sound government practices in procurement and financing."   

On June 7, 2021, the Organisation for Economic Co-operation and Development (OECD) committed to support the BDN at the meeting of the latter's executive consultation group in Paris, France. On June 16, 2021 Krach was awarded the Westernization Award by StrategEast for his work as Under Secretary of State in the country of Georgia for leading the Clean Network and Clean Infrastructure initiatives, which provide an alternative to the "One Belt One Road" for the countries of Eurasia and is supported by all G7 countries as the Build Back a Better World. In March 2022, Krach was nominated for the 2022 Nobel Peace Prize for developing the 'Trust Principle' doctrine as a peaceful alternative to authoritarian's 'power principle.'

Under Secretary Krach committed $2 million (USD) of U.S. State Department seed money for the steering committee and issued an invitation to other G7 members to join. On October 19, 2020, on behalf of the twelveThree Seas nations, President Kersti Kaljulaid endorsed the BDN and the Three Seas Summit in Tallinn, Estonia.

Objectives 
Over the next five years, the G7 governments and its private business sector will invest $600 billion. It aims to offer an alternative to China's estimated $1 trillion infrastructure investments worldwide over the past decade.

According to Singapore Forum experts, with the advent of the G7-led PGII, notions such as economic development and foreign direct investment could be "merged" with geopolitical and military objectives:

See also 
 Belt and Road Initiative
 Build Back Better World
 Global Gateway

References 

Foreign direct investment
G7 summits